The 2018–19 SVB Eerste Divisie is the 86th season of the SVB Eerste Divisie, the top division football competition in Suriname. The season began on 1 November 2018 and concluded on 4 August 2019.

League table

Related competitions
2018–19 SVB Eerste Klasse
2018–19 SVB Tweede Klasse
2018–19 SVB Cup
2019 Suriname President's Cup

References

External links
Surinaamse Voetbal Bond

SVB Eerste Divisie seasons
1
Suriname